Robert Anthony Woodard II (born September 22, 1999) is an American professional basketball player for the Oklahoma City Blue of the NBA G League. He played college basketball for Mississippi State, and has appeared in 25 NBA games for the Sacramento Kings.

Early life and high school career
Woodard grew up playing basketball and baseball but narrowed his focus to basketball by the time he started high school, in part due to his exceptional height. He was already receiving Division I college attention in eighth grade. He played basketball for Columbus High School in Columbus, Mississippi. As a sophomore, Woodard led Columbus to its first Mississippi Class 6A state title after averaging 20.2 points, 7.1 rebounds and four assists per game. In his junior season, he averaged 25.2 points, 13.1 rebounds, 3.2 assists and three blocks per game and was named Mississippi Gatorade Player of the Year. As a senior, Woodard won his second Class 6A state championship and repeated as Mississippi Gatorade Player of the Year. A four-star recruit and the highest-rated prospect in his state, he committed to play college basketball for Mississippi State over offers from Alabama, Memphis and Ole Miss, among others.

College career
As a freshman, Woodard averaged 5.5 points and 4.1 rebounds per game in 17.4 minutes per game. He started one contest and shot 46 percent on field goals. He spent the following summer working on his shooting and lifting weights. On November 17, 2019, Woodard set career highs with 21 points and 16 rebounds in a 82–59 win over New Orleans. As a sophomore, Woodard averaged 11.4 points and 6.5 rebounds per game. Following the season, Woodard declared for the 2020 NBA draft, with the intention of remaining in the draft. He had career totals of 539 points, 53 steals, 49 blocks, 65 assists and 342 rebounds.

Professional career

Sacramento Kings (2020–2022)
Woodard was selected by the Memphis Grizzlies with the 40th pick in the 2020 NBA draft. He was subsequently traded alongside a 2022 second-round draft selection to the Sacramento Kings in exchange for Xavier Tillman. On December 1, 2020, Woodard was signed by the Kings. On February 1, 2021, it was announced Woodard would had his first assignment at the NBA G League for the Austin Spurs.

On January 5, 2022, Woodard was assigned to the Stockton Kings after suffering an undisclosed illness. On February 10, he was waived by the Kings.

Oklahoma City Blue (2022–present)
On February 19, 2022, Woodard was acquired via waivers by the Iowa Wolves. Two days later, Woodard was traded to the Oklahoma City Blue in exchange for Melvin Frazier.

On March 4, 2022, Woodard signed a two-way contract with the San Antonio Spurs.

On October 4, 2022, Woodard signed with the Oklahoma City Thunder. On October 7, Woodard was waived after appearing in one pre season game. On November 3, 2022, Woodard was named to the opening night roster for the Oklahoma City Blue.

National team career
Woodard won a gold medal with the United States at the 2015 FIBA Americas Under-16 Championship in Bahía Blanca, Argentina. He played in all five games and averaged 5.6 points and 3.8 rebounds per game.

Career statistics

NBA

|-
| style="text-align:left;"| 
| style="text-align:left;"| Sacramento
| 13 || 0 || 3.5 || .400 || .167 || .375 || 1.2 || .2 || .0 || .2 || 1.5
|-
| style="text-align:left;"| 
| style="text-align:left;"| Sacramento
| 12 || 0 || 3.5 || .125 || .250 || 1.000 || .9 || .3 || .1 || .1 || .6
|- class="sortbottom"
| style="text-align:center;" colspan="2"| Career
| 25 || 0 || 3.5 || .278 || .200 || .500 || 1.1 || .2 || .0 || .2 || 1.1

College

|-
| style="text-align:left;"| 2018–19
| style="text-align:left;"| Mississippi State
| 34 || 1 || 17.5 || .468 || .273 || .580 || 4.1 || .7 || .5 || .5 || 5.5
|-
| style="text-align:left;"| 2019–20
| style="text-align:left;"| Mississippi State
| 31 || 31 || 33.1 || .495 || .429 || .641 || 6.5 || 1.3 || 1.1 || 1.0 || 11.4
|- class="sortbottom"
| style="text-align:center;" colspan="2"| Career
| 65 || 32 || 24.9 || .485 || .368 || .617 || 5.3 || 1.0 || .8 || .8 || 8.3

Personal life
Woodard's father, also named Robert Woodard, left high school as the Mississippi all-time leading scorer in boys basketball, with 4,274 points, before playing for Mississippi State at the collegiate level.

References

External links
Mississippi State Bulldogs bio
USA Basketball bio

1999 births
Living people
21st-century African-American sportspeople
African-American basketball players
American men's basketball players
Austin Spurs players
Basketball players from Mississippi
Memphis Grizzlies draft picks
Mississippi State Bulldogs men's basketball players
Oklahoma City Blue players
Sacramento Kings players
Small forwards
Sportspeople from Starkville, Mississippi
Stockton Kings players
United States men's national basketball team players